Lieutenant General Markus Gygax is a former commander of the Swiss Air Force. His active career within the SAF began in 1971 when he achieved his qualification as a pilot. In 1973 he joined the surveillance wing flying the Hawker Hunter, and in 1978 underwent conversion to the F-5 at Williams AFB, Arizona.
He was also pilot by the Swiss Air Force's jet display team Patrouille Suisse when they used the Hawker Hunter. 
Starting with 1985 until 1989 he was the head of the F-5 training school. In 1994 he was appointed interim commander of an aviation regiment and from 1998 through 2002 he commanded the 31st Aviation Brigade. By 2003 he became chief of air force operations and deputy commander of the air force.

He took office as overall commander of the Swiss Air Force on 1 March 2009 and gathered more than 4,600 flying hours. He retired in 2012, his successor was Aldo C. Schellenberg.

Milestones
1978 - Williams Air Force Base, Arizona, F-5E/F Tiger Conversion Courses
1985—1989 - Chief flying instructor on F-5E/F Tiger in Pilot Officers' Schools
1990—1991 - Assigned staff officer to the Chief of Operations of the Swiss Air Force
1991—1992 - Staff College "Ecole Supérieure de Guerre Aérienne", Paris, France
1994 - Interim Commander of an air force regiment
1994—1997 - Chief of F/A-18 Hornet training conversion unit
1998—2002 - Commander of an Air Force Brigade
2003 - Chief of Operations and Deputy Commander-in-chief of the Swiss Air Force
2004—2008 - Chief Air Force Operations Staff and Deputy Commander of the Air Force
21.06.2008—31.12.2012  - Chief of staff of the Swiss Air Force

Decorations and awards

References

External links
Heads of the Swiss Air Force since 1914

1950 births
Living people
People from Solothurn
Swiss generals
Swiss military officers
Swiss Air Force personnel